Stephen David John (born 1979), is a British philosopher . He is a Fellow of Pembroke College, Cambridge, and the University Hatton Professor in the Philosophy of Public Health. John is a member of the academic staff and lecturer in the Department of History and Philosophy of Science (HPS), his research focuses on the philosophy of science, political philosophy and the philosophy of public health.

He obtained his BA, MPhil, and PhD from the University of Cambridge. His doctoral advisor was baroness Onora O'Neill. and his thesis title "Vulnerability, Health and Risk: towards a normative framework  for public health policy".

Since 2012 he has been a Fellow of Pembroke College, and the University Hatton Professor in the Philosophy of Public Health. He is also a member of the Leverhulme Centre for the Future of Intelligence and of Cancer Research UK.

References

External links
Profile

Living people
British philosophers
Fellows of Pembroke College, Cambridge
1979 births
Alumni of the University of Cambridge
Bioethicists
Philosophers of science
Historians of science
British historians
Public health